Camptoneurites is an extinct insect which existed in Russia during the middle Permian period.

Additional synonyms for camptoneurites are Camptoneuritidae Martynov, Demopteridae Carpenter, and Jabloniidae Kukalova.

References 

Grylloblattodea
Permian insects
Fossil taxa described in 2010
Fossils of Russia
Prehistoric insect genera